The ACF Fiorentina–Juventus F.C. rivalry is an inter-city football rivalry contested between Florence-based Fiorentina and Turin-based Juventus. Unlike most other football derbies, this one is borne not out of geographical proximity (such as the Derby della Madonnina); political differences (El Clásico); or longstanding competitiveness (Liverpool–Manchester United rivalry), but rather is a development from the latter decades of the 20th century based on local patriotism, or campanilismo, bitterness and accusations of 'thievery'.

The rivalry has been fuelled by their controversial meetings in cup finals, and competition in the transfer market. A player transferring from one club to the other, especially from Florence to Turin, is usually branded a 'traitor' by fans.

Juventus is the most successful team in Italian football, winning 36 league titles, 14 Coppa Italia titles and nine Supercoppa Italiana titles, all national records. Fiorentina, meanwhile, has won two league titles, six Coppa Italia titles, and one Supercoppa Italiana.

Background 
To some extent the rivalry has its origins in the fans of the local teams in Tuscany, as in many other areas of Italy, growing tired of seeing people from their towns heading off to support the country's most successful teams, primarily Juventus. Like many of Europe's biggest clubs, the Bianconeri have attracted followers from far and wide, but the Renaissance town of Florence remained true to Fiorentina. In addition to this and the typical aspect of pride between the residents of two important cities, Juventus had beaten Fiorentina 11–0 in their first league meeting in 1928, a humiliating result which had not been forgotten by either set of fans despite the passage of time. They also contested the 1960 Coppa Italia final, won by Juve.

1981–82 Serie A title 
In 1980, Fiorentina was bought by Flavio Pontello, a man from a rich house-building family who had aspirations to bring the Viola its third title and built the team around Italian star, Giancarlo Antognoni. On the final day of the 1981–82 Serie A season, with both teams competing for the national championship, a series of debatable decisions in two different matches intensified the rivalry. Heading into the last game, both teams were level on 44 points at the top of the table; Fiorentina went to relegation-threatened Cagliari, who needed a point to survive, while Juventus headed to Catanzaro, in seventh position with nothing to play for. Fiorentina had a goal disallowed for a push on the opposing goalkeeper as Cagliari managed to play out a 0–0 draw to steer clear of relegation. In Calabria, Catanzaro were denied a penalty while Juventus were awarded one, from which they scored to win 1–0 and claim their 20th scudetto In the aftermath, Fiorentina's playmaker Giancarlo Antognoni famously remarked, 'Ci hanno rubato il titolo', meaning 'They have stolen the title'. The Viola tifosi soon coined a saying, 'meglio secondo che ladri', meaning 'better to be second than thieves'.

1989–90 UEFA Cup final 
Juventus won two more championships in the 1980s, while Fiorentina had inconsistent fortunes. In 1985, Fiorentina bought Roberto Baggio, an 18-year-old striker, from Vicenza, for 2.7 billion lire (£1.5 million). Considered one of the leading players of the league, he led Fiorentina to the final of the 1989–90 UEFA Cup, setting up the first all-Italian final in the history of the tournament against their arch-nemesis Juventus. Both sides had had close encounters with German teams in the semi-finals, Fiorentina beating Werder Bremen on away goals, and Juventus pipping 1. FC Köln 3–2.

The final was to be played over two legs, with the first leg to be held in Turin, while the second was held in Stadio Partenio in Avellino – Fiorentina's home stadium was under renovation for the 1990 FIFA World Cup, and the fixture was originally moved to the Stadio Renato Curi in Perugia, fairly close to Florence, but was then moved further away as punishment for supporters having staged a pitch invasion during the Werder Bremen tie. Avellino, despite being in Southern Italy, was a town with many fans of the Bianconeri and this concerned the Viola supporters. However, worries turned to anger when, with the score tied 1–1 in Turin, officials missed an apparent push by Juventus' Pierluigi Casiraghi on Fiorentina's Celeste Pin, allowing Angelo Alessio's deflected shot to fire the home side in front. Juventus ended up winning 3–1, and during the post-match interview, Pin was heard shouting 'ladri' (thieves) at Juventus' manager Dino Zoff. Between the two legs, Juventus' goalkeeper Stefano Tacconi reminded Fiorentina that, while they might win the war of words, his side would win on the pitch. The second leg ended 0–0, and Juventus became the first Italian team (sixth across Europe) to win two UEFA Cup titles.

Transfer of Roberto Baggio 
Pontello was suffering from economic difficulties by this time, and was considering the sale of the club's prized asset: Roberto Baggio. Juventus were the club willing to pay a then world-record fee of 25 billion lire (£8 million), the world record transfer for a footballer at the time. His transfer led to severe riots in the streets of Florence and fans laid siege to the club's headquarters; reports described bricks, chains and Molotov cocktails being thrown. In the two days following the transfer, Pontello was forced to take refuge in the Stadio Artemio Franchi, while 50 injuries and nine arrests were recorded. Baggio was called a 'traitor', but he still held the city of Florence and its football team close to his heart. On his return to his former home, he refused to take a penalty awarded to Juventus and was seen embracing a Viola scarf thrown by the Florentine supporters while waving it in the direction of the Curva Fiesole, the stronghold of the club's ultras. While this endeared him to the Fiorentina followers, it caused a rift between him and Juventus supporters.

1990s and 2000s 
Fiorentina were relegated in 1993, and although they made it back the very next year, the rivalry took on a somewhat one-sided dimension in the following years. Both sides had scandals to deal with in the 2000s, as Fiorentina declared bankruptcy in June 2002 and was re-established by the della Valle brothers in August 2002 as Associazione Calcio Fiorentina e Fiorentina Viola, playing in Serie C2, the fourth tier of Italian football. Former Juventus player, Angelo di Livio, was the only player to remain at the club as they returned to top-flight football in two years. Both teams, among others, were implicated in the 2006 Calciopoli scandal, which relegated Juventus to Serie B, and revoked their last two titles. Fiorentina meanwhile were given a 15-point penalty applied to the next season.

In 2012, the hierarchies of the two clubs clashed after Juventus made a late bid to hijack Fiorentina's pursuit of Dimitar Berbatov. In the end, the Bulgarian snubbed both clubs for Fulham, but this did not stop the Fiorentina owners from claiming their rivals 'knew nothing of the values of honesty, fair play and sporting ethics.'

Late 2010s and 2020s 
History repeated itself for Fiorentina in the summer of 2017, with the della Valle brothers looking to sell the club but with no takers. Many top players, including Matías Vecino, Gonzalo Rodríguez, Borja Valero, and Ciprian Tătărușanu were released or sold as the owners wanted to recoup funds rather than invest in the club. They wished to renew the contract of local star, Federico Bernardeschi, but he was unwilling to renew his deal with Fiorentina and instead secured a transfer to rivals Juventus for €40 million on a five-year deal. Fans responded with vulgar banners saying "A chi non piacerebbe sputarti in faccia... Bernardeschi gobbo di merda", which translates to "Who wouldn't like to spit in your face, Bernardeschi you shitty hunchback". On 9 February 2018, Bernardeschi returned to Florence, receiving vulgar insults throughout the match. He scored a free kick in the second half to silence the crowd. Due to his departure, Fiorentina looked to build their squad around their new academy recruit, Federico Chiesa, who had played in the Fiorentina system since 2007. However, in 2020, Chiesa followed Bernardeschi to Turin on loan (with an obligation to buy worth €50 million) and was met with banners calling him despicable and a traitor. In the January transfer window in 2022, young Fiorentina striker Dušan Vlahović's contract was set to expire in the summer of 2023, and with his unwillingness to sign a new deal, was transferred to Juventus for €75 million. Fiorentina president, Rocco Commisso, who wanted to transfer the striker abroad, slammed Vlahović and his agents saying "It was clear he already had a deal ... He said no to every offer. I went to England many times, each time he said no ... he wanted to ruin Fiorentina". As with the previous transfers, various insulting banners were put out by the Fiorentina fans, this time with a stronger, more-threatening tone.

Official matches 
 SF = Semi-finals
 QF = Quarter-finals
 R16 = Round of 16
 R32 = Round of 32
 GS = Group stage
 R1 = Round 1
 R2 = Round 2

Head-to-head ranking in Serie A (1930–2022)

• Total: Fiorentina with 12 higher finishes, Juventus with 71 higher finishes (as of the end of the 2021–22 season).

Notes:
 Only Juventus qualified for the final round of 8 teams in 1946; Fiorentina finished 5th in their group and didn't qualify

Statistics

Players who have played for both clubs

Transferred before the 1981–82 season

Transferred after the 1981–82 season

Trophies

References 

ACF Fiorentina
Juventus F.C.
Italian football derbies
Football in Turin
Sport in Tuscany